Advent Hunstone (known as "Old" Advent) was from a family of wood carvers from Tideswell Derbyshire. He worked in the late 19th and early 20th centuries. His work includes a combination of natural, representational and symbolical material.  Other nearby churches in Derbyshire where Advent Hunstone's work may be found include the lych gate at Burbage, the reredos and high altar at Dronfield, the organ cases and choirstalls at Matlock St Giles, various furnishings at Millers Dale, and at Wormhill the chancel furnishings.

Key Sources 
Martin Hulbert,  The Woodcarvings at Tideswell

References 

English woodcarvers
Year of birth missing
Year of death missing
19th-century English artists
20th-century English artists